Stagecoach Driver is a 1951 American Western film directed by Lewis D. Collins and starring Whip Wilson, Fuzzy Knight and Gloria Winters.

The film's sets were designed by the art director Harry Reif.

Cast
Whip Wilson as Whip Wilson 
Fuzzy Knight as Texas McGillicudy 
Jim Bannon as Jim Bannon 
Lane Bradford as henchman Sam Jenkins 
Gloria Winters as Sue Cassidy 
Pierce Lyden as Larry Edwards 
Barbara Woodell as Kate Cassidy
Leonard Penn as George Barnes 
Marshall Reed as Sheriff 
Stanley Price as henchman 
John Hart as Slim Cole

References

External links

1951 Western (genre) films
American Western (genre) films
Films directed by Lewis D. Collins
Monogram Pictures films
Films scored by Raoul Kraushaar
American black-and-white films
1950s English-language films
1950s American films